The 2015 Denkova-Staviski Cup was a senior international figure skating competition held in October 2015 at the Winter Sports Palace in Sofia, Bulgaria. It was part of the 2015–16 ISU Challenger Series. Medals were awarded in the disciplines of men's singles, ladies' singles, and ice dancing.

Entries
The preliminary entries were published on 6 October 2015.

Results: ISU Challenger Series

Medal summary

Men

Ladies

Ice dancing

Results: Junior and advanced novice

Medal summary: Junior

Medal summary: Advanced novice

References

External links
 
 Challenger Series results, Junior and novice results
 2015 Denkova-Staviski Cup at the International Skating Union

Denkova-Staviski Cup
Denkova-Staviski Cup, 2015
Denkova-Staviski Cup